Víctor José Solarte (born 6 January 1986) is a Venezuelan track and field hurdler who competed in the 400 metres hurdles. His personal best was 50.53 seconds, set in 2009. He was a twenty four-time national champion.

Solarte competed at the 2003 World Youth Championships in Athletics and 2004 World Junior Championships in Athletics, but has never represented his country at the senior World Championships in Athletics. His highest level global honour was a silver behind Raphael Fernandes at the 2011 Military World Games (his time there was 50.60 seconds, among his career best).

At the South American Championships in Athletics he was the hurdles runner-up to Tiago Bueno in 2005, and won further individual bronze medals at the 2011 and 2015 editions. He also won a 4 × 400 metres relay bronze with Venezuela in 2006. He was the 2005 hurdles champion at the South American Junior Championships in Athletics, having won the youth silver behind Diego Venâncio in 2002.

In other regional competitions, he has won minor medals at the ALBA Games and Bolivarian Games. He is a four-time participant (2008, 2010, 2012, 2016) and has been a finalist at the Central American and Caribbean Games and Championships. He represented Venezuela at the 2011 Pan American Games, failing to reach the final.

International competitions

References

External links

Living people
1986 births
Venezuelan male hurdlers
Athletes (track and field) at the 2011 Pan American Games
Pan American Games competitors for Venezuela